Brodmann area 52 (H) or parainsular area, is a subdivision of the cytoarchitecturally defined temporal region of the cerebral cortex in the brain.

It is located in the bank of the lateral sulcus on the dorsal surface of the temporal lobe. Its medial boundary corresponds approximately to the junction between the temporal lobe and the insula. Cytoarchitecturally it is bounded laterally by the anterior transverse temporal area 42 (H) (Brodmann-1909).

See also

 Brodmann area

52
Temporal lobe